Raúl Sánchez Sánchez (born 8 November 1997) is a Spanish professional footballer who plays for CD Castellón. Mainly a left winger, he can also play as a left back.

Club career
Born in Madrid, Sánchez represented EF Atlético Casarrubuelos and CF Trival Valderas as a youth. He was promoted to the latter's first team in July 2016, and made his senior debut during the campaign, in Tercera División.

On 27 June 2017, Sánchez joined AD Alcorcón and was assigned to the reserves also in the fourth division. On 8 July of the following year, he moved to another reserve team, CD Leganés B in the same category.

On 25 June 2019, Sánchez signed a professional contract with Lega until 2021, but was loaned to Segunda División B side Burgos CF on 9 August. On 5 October 2020, he moved to fellow third division side CF Rayo Majadahonda also in a temporary deal.

Sánchez left Lega on 1 July 2021, as his contract expired, and signed permanently with Rayo in Primera División RFEF on 10 August 2021. On 13 November, he scored a hat-trick in a 4–2 away win over Internacional de Madrid.

On 30 January 2022, Sánchez signed a two-and-a-half-year contract with Segunda División side UD Ibiza, after the club paid his release clause. He made his professional debut on 6 March, coming on as a second-half substitute for Miki Villar in a 1–1 away draw against SD Ponferradina.

References

External links

1997 births
Living people
Spanish footballers
Footballers from Madrid
Association football wingers
Segunda División players
Primera Federación players
Segunda División B players
Tercera División players
AD Alcorcón B players
CD Leganés B players
Burgos CF footballers
CF Rayo Majadahonda players
UD Ibiza players
CD Castellón footballers